John Cooper (23 May 1933 – 20 October 2020) was an Australian rules footballer who played with Hawthorn in the Victorian Football League (VFL).

Notes

External links 

1933 births
2020 deaths
Australian rules footballers from Victoria (Australia)
Hawthorn Football Club players
Myrtleford Football Club players